Erikslund Shopping Center is a shopping center located next to highway E18 in Erikslund, Sweden. It opened in 2011 and was established by Ikano Retail Centres, with two anchor tenants on each end of the mall, IKEA and a City Gross supermarket.

The retail park is the third biggest in Sweden, after Kungens Kurva and Barkarby in terms of sales, according to the Nordic Council of Shopping Centers.

See also 
 List of shopping centres in Sweden

References

External links
 
 Erikslund retail park
 Erikslund Shopping Center, YouTube (Promotional clip by Ikano in Swedish, with English subtitles.)

Shopping centres in Sweden
Shopping malls established in 2011
2011 establishments in Sweden
Buildings and structures in Västmanland County